The West Kent Football Club was a short-lived 19th century rugby football club that was notable for being one of the twenty-one founding members of the Rugby Football Union, as well as producing a number of international players in the sport's early international fixtures.

History
West Kent were founded in 1867 by a core of Old Rugbeians including Arthur Guillemard. They used the ground of West Kent cricket club. The cricket club had been founded many years previously after members of the Prince's Plain Cricket Club from Bromley lost their ground in 1821 due to the enclosure of Bromley Common. They were saved by the Lord of the Manor of Chislehurst who gave them leave to create a new ground on eight acres of Chislehurst Common. Their first game took place on 20 July 1822. It played its home matches on the outlying part of the cricket ground. Initial objections to the playing of football on the cricket pitch due to fears of it injuring the turf were allayed by reports that the playing of football improved the turf by destroying the short heather.

West Kent at first played football using both Association rules and Rugby School rules. They used the Imperial Arms at Chislehurst as their headquarters. However, in 1874 it became exclusively a rugby football club and changed its colours from orange and black to white jerseys with a Kentish Horse badge, white knickerbockers and blue stockings. The club changed its colours in 1881 to blue and white jerseys and in 1882 to blue and amber. Opponents on its extensive season list included Blackheath FC, Richmond FC, The Gipsies and Ravenscourt Park. In 1886 the members decided to give up rugby and played Association Football only.

Foundation of the RFU
On 26 January 1871, 32 members representing twenty-one London and suburban football clubs that followed Rugby School rules (Wasps were invited by failed to attend) assembled at the Pall Mall Restaurant in Regent Street. E.C. Holmes, captain of the Richmond Club assumed the presidency. It was resolved unanimously that the formation of a Rugby Football Society was desirable and thus the Rugby Football Union was formed. A president, a secretary and treasurer, and a committee of thirteen were elected, to whom was entrusted the drawing-up of the laws of the game upon the basis of the code in use at Rugby School. A. G. Guillemard represented West Kent and was one of the thirteen original committee members. He later became president of the RFU from 1878 to 1882.

The First Internationals
The first international rugby match was played between Scotland and England in 1871 and West Kent provided two players, A. G. Guillemard and Joseph Fletcher Green. A. G. Guillemard also played in the second match in 1872 along with former Blackheath player C. W. Sherrard.

Notable players
A number of West Kent players represented England:

 A. G. Guillemard (first capped 1871)
 Joseph Green (first capped 1871)
 Charles Sherrard (first capped 1871, but for West Kent in 1872)

References

English rugby union teams
Rugby union clubs in London
Rugby clubs established in 1867
Defunct English rugby union teams
Association football clubs established in 1867
Defunct football clubs in England
1867 establishments in England
Sport in the London Borough of Bromley